Nalong 2 (Koaegeol Rongmaen Narongi) is a South Korean animation, also known by the name Longman, the Little Big Hero. It is a product of the major anime broadcaster Munhwa Broadcasting Corporation, and the animation was done by the now defunct Studio Kaab. The story centers on the animal and hero character Nalong, a world hero fighter squirrel.

Characters
The central characters of Nalong 2's Family are:

Nalong, Longman, Nalong's father (Dalbong), Achangna, Kaka, Headingman, 10 Brothers, Panji, Panji's father, Hobi, Tori, Riri, Ukkya, Ukkya's mother, Ukkya's father, Sungsung, Sungsung's mother, Tajori, Tajori's mother, Tajori's father, Penguil, and the Prizia.

Production Staff
Creator: Lee Byeong Deok
Make Producer: Kim Sin Hwa, Choi Ka Hee
Character Design: Jo Yeon Joo, Lee Jeong Min, Bak So Jeong
Key Animater: Lee Seok In, Lee Jeong Min
Set Director: Kim Hae Seong
Camera Director: Kim Yeong Ho
Sound Director: Ko Kwang Hyeon
Director: Yoo Jae Woon
Producers: Choi Ka Hee, An Seong Eun
Art Director: Kim Hae Seong
Scenario: Hwang Seok Yeon
Continuity: Kooji Aritomi
Marketing: Kim Sin Hwa
Art Control: Yoo Jae Woon, Lee Jeong Min
Art Board: Kim Hae Seong
Color Deposit: Jo Yeon Joo
Original Picture: Lee Seok in, Yoo Jae Woon, Lee Jeong Min, Kim Je Hyeong
Coloring Camera: Hoho Studio, Kim Yeong Ho, Kim Soo Kyeong, Lim Hyeon Hee, Moon Jeong In
Opening Maker: Gerilla Media
Ending Maker: Choi Ka Hee
Master Edit: Toy Media, Kim Min Ho, Ban Seung Joon
Record Director: Jo Jeong Ran
Sound Director: Meca Studio, Ko Kwang Hyeon
Sound Design: Meca Studio Lee Kyoo Beom, Lee Jae Heung, Jeong Seung Hyeon
Music: Lee Jong Kyo
Animate: Hwang Soo Jin, Lee Eun Sil, Jeong Yeong Hee, Yoo Soo Ok
Online Advertise: An Sook Won
Creative Producer: An Seong Eun
Executive Producer: Kim Sin Hwa
Network: Film & Line, Meca Studio, Toy Media
Business Networks: Iconix Entertainment, Wiz Entertainment, Zero One Pictures, Ani Cast
Broadcaster:Munhwa Broadcasting Corporation, On media (Tooniverse)

Music
Opening Theme: Longman, the Little Big Hero (정의의 쾌걸롱맨)
Ending Theme: The Achangna (아짱나님이시다)
Music Composer: Studio Kaab
Song Composer: Lee Jong Kyo
Singer: Kim Mi Jeong

Voice actors
Nalong: Kim Seo Yeong
Sungsung: Kim Youngsun
Ukkya, Tori: Wooh Jeong Sin
Achangna: Han Chae Eon
Prizia, Hobi, Riri: Ryoo Jeom Hee
Penguil: Rhee Cheol Yong
Nalong's father (Dalbong), Headingman: Choi Han
Panji, Tajori, Ukkya's mother: Yeo Min Jeong
Kaka: Eom Sang Hyeon

See also
Nalong - Nalong Season 1

External links
Studio Kaab Nalong 2 Homepage
MBC Nalong 2 Homepage
Studio Kaab Homepage - Nalong Animater

2006 South Korean television series debuts
2007 South Korean television series endings
South Korean children's animated comedy television series
South Korean children's animated superhero television series
MBC TV original programming
Animated television series about squirrels
Animated television series about families